The canton of Adour-Gersoise is an administrative division of the Gers department, southwestern France. It was created at the French canton reorganisation which came into effect in March 2015. Its capital is in Riscle.

It consists of the following communes:
 
Aignan
Arblade-le-Bas
Aurensan
Avéron-Bergelle
Barcelonne-du-Gers
Bernède
Bouzon-Gellenave
Cahuzac-sur-Adour
Castelnavet
Caumont
Corneillan
Fustérouau
Gée-Rivière
Goux
Labarthète
Lannux
Lelin-Lapujolle
Loussous-Débat
Margouët-Meymes
Maulichères
Maumusson-Laguian
Pouydraguin
Projan
Riscle
Sabazan
Saint-Germé
Saint-Mont
Sarragachies
Ségos
Tarsac
Termes-d'Armagnac
Vergoignan
Verlus
Viella

References

Cantons of Gers